VAALCO Energy is a company engaged in hydrocarbon exploration. It is organized in Delaware and headquartered in Houston, Texas with operations primarily in the Etame Marin block offshore Gabon.

As of December 31, 2021, the company had  of proved reserves, all of which was petroleum.

The company’s primary source of revenue is from its 58.8% interest, via a production sharing contract, in operations in the 750,000 acre (3,000 km²) Etame Marin block, offshore Gabon. The company also owns a 45.9% working interest in an undeveloped portion of a block offshore Equatorial Guinea.

History
In 2000, the company sold a 32.5% interest in the Etame Marin permit offshore Gabon to PanAfrican Energy Corp.

In November 2012, the company acquired a 31% non-operating working interest in a production and development area offshore Equatorial Guinea from Petronas for $10 million.

In November 2016, the company acquired an additional 3.23% participating interest (2.98% working interest) in the Etame Marin permit offshore Gabon.

In December 2016, Cary Bounds was named chief executive officer of the company.

References

External links

1985 establishments in Texas
Companies listed on the New York Stock Exchange
Oil companies of the United States